"6th Avenue Heartache" is a song by the American rock band The Wallflowers. It was released in April 1996 as the lead single from their second album Bringing Down the Horse. The song became their first hit, peaking at No. 8 on the US Modern Rock Tracks chart, No. 10 on the US Mainstream Rock Tracks chart, and No. 33 on the US Hot 100 Airplay chart. The background vocals in this song are by Adam Duritz from Counting Crows. Though the song was a hit on rock radio, it was overshadowed by its follow-up single, "One Headlight".

Background and writing
Jakob Dylan, the band's lead singer, wrote the song when he was 18 years old and considers it the first real song he had written. It was meant to go on their self-titled first album, but the record company would not allow it. The lyrics are based on Dylan's own experiences while living in New York City, in particular the story of a homeless man who would sit outside Dylan's window and play the same songs every day. One day, the man was gone, but his things were still there, until gradually people started taking them. Mike Campbell from Tom Petty and The Heartbreakers played the slide guitar on the song, though he recorded the track in his own studio and never even met the band members.

Music video
The video, shot in New York, was directed by movie director David Fincher, known for such films as Se7en and Fight Club. There is a slight error in the video: Rama's Cafe, portrayed as a meeting place for the band, was actually on 281 5th Avenue, not 6th Avenue. The building was eventually demolished, and a new apartment building is in the process of being constructed on the site.

In popular culture
It was featured during the Friends season 4 episode "The One with the Fake Party".

It was featured in the Cold Case season 2 episode "Revenge".

The Wallflowers performed "6th Avenue Heartache" on The Late Show with David Letterman in 1996.

In 2012, the Wallflowers reunited to perform the song as part of Letterman's online concert series "Live on Letterman".

Track listing
 "6th Avenue Heartache" (Edit) – 4:22
 "Used to Be Lucky" – 6:35
 "Angel on My Bike" – 4:22
 "6th Avenue Heartache" – 5:37

Charts

References

External links
Information on Songfacts

1996 debut singles
1996 singles
1996 songs
The Wallflowers songs
Songs written by Jakob Dylan
Song recordings produced by T Bone Burnett
Music videos directed by David Fincher
Interscope Records singles
Sixth Avenue
Songs about nostalgia
Songs about heartache